The Mazda CX-30 is a subcompact crossover SUV produced by Mazda. Based on the fourth-generation Mazda3, it debuted at the 2019 Geneva Motor Show, to slot in between the CX-3 and the CX-5. It went on sale in Japan on 24 October 2019, with global units being produced at Mazda's Hiroshima factory, North and South American units built in Salamanca, Guanajuato, Mexico, Thailand and initial Australian units made at the AutoAlliance Thailand plant in Rayong, and China-market units produced in Nanjing by Changan Mazda.

Overview
The CX-30 features lightweight construction to improve performance and economy, and is offered in either front-wheel-drive or all-wheel-drive.

According to Naohito Saga, the CX-30's program manager, the new model is targeted to drivers who are still single or are married and starting a family in the United States. Mazda chief designer Ryo Yanagisawa said that it will be more acceptable as a family car in Europe and Japan. Saga also noted that Mazda named the vehicle CX-30, to avoid confusion with the China-only CX-4.

The CX-30 was released in the UK in December 2019 and in North America in January 2020. It was launched in the Philippines on 28 November 2019, Malaysia on 15 January 2020, Indonesia on 28 January 2020, and Thailand on 6 March 2020. The 2.5 turbo model was released internationally in February 2021.

Design

Powertrain

Safety features
The CX-30 is equipped with seven airbags, Isofix, ABS, and EBS.

Safety

Euro NCAP 
Euro NCAP test results for a LHD, 5-door hatchback variant on a 2019 registration:

ANCAP 
ANCAP test results on a RHD, 5-door small SUV variant on a 2020 registration:

IIHS

2021 
The 2021 CX-30 was awarded the "Top Safety Pick +" by the Insurance Institute for Highway Safety. It received overall Good and Superior ratings on all categories except the Premium trim built before October 2020, as it received a Poor rating on headlights due to the LED projector low beams creating excessive glare.

2022 
The 2022 CX-30 was awarded the "Top Safety Pick +" by the Insurance Institute for Highway Safety.

Reception
The CX-30 received positive reviews upon its release. Top Gear gave it a score of 7 out of 10, with the verdict being: "Good car, the Mazda CX-30. Handles well, looks smart and has a lovely interior." Car and Driver rated it 9.5 out of 10, commenting that "If you're shopping small SUVs, the Mazda CX-30 should be at the top of your consideration list." Edmunds.com gave it a score of 7.9 out of 10, commenting that "Admittedly, it's a niche vehicle, but it has the potential to be a 'just-right' fit for car shoppers who want a slightly roomier and nicer vehicle than an subcompact crossover SUV but don't like the greater cost of bigger models such as the CX-5 or CR-V." Alan Taylor-Jones of Autocar gave the CX-30 four out of five stars, saying: "Satisfyingly agile and blessed with a truly high quality interior, the CX-30 is a tempting choice if you don’t need vast amounts of space inside."

On the other hand, Christian Seabaugh of Motor Trend was not impressed with the CX-30, saying that "The end result is that it feels neither sporty nor luxurious. Like the brand itself, the CX-30 (alongside the more successful CX-5) finds itself stuck in the middle. Worse still, it's a disappointing effort in a competitive class." What Car? rated the CX-30 three out of five stars, commenting that "Its real strength lies in its ability to feel as luxurious as premium brands in this class at a much cheaper price. Just remember that rear space is tight and the boot isn’t anything to write home about, either."

Awards
The CX-30 won the 2020 Red Dot Design Award in the Passenger Car category, as well as the 2020 Autozeitung Design Trophy in the SUV category. It also received the 2019 Auto Bild Golden Steering Wheel Award in the SUV/crossover category for vehicles up to 4.4 meters in length and was named Thailand Car of the Year 2020 by the Thai Automotive Journalists Association, as well as the 2020 Editor's Choice Car of the Year by Top Gear Philippines.

In 2021, the CX-30 was named Car of the Year by Wheels magazine in Australia, and it was selected as a Top Pick for Subcompact SUV Under 25,000 by Consumer Reports.

U.S. News & World Report ranked the Mazda CX-30 at No. 1 (tied with the Kia Soul and Hyundai Kona) on its list of Best Subcompact SUVs for 2022, giving it a score of 8.4 out of 10.

Sales
In 2021, the CX-30 became the best-selling car in Colombia.

References

External links

CX-30
Cars introduced in 2019
2020s cars
Mini sport utility vehicles
Crossover sport utility vehicles
ANCAP small off-road
Euro NCAP small off-road
Front-wheel-drive vehicles
All-wheel-drive vehicles
Hybrid sport utility vehicles